Stjepan Gomboš (1895–1975) was a Croatian-Jewish architect responsible for the design of many business and residential buildings throughout the city of Zagreb. Gomboš was also active in other parts of Croatia and, as a writer, contributed much to the Croatian modern architecture. He was buried at the Mirogoj Cemetery.

References

Bibliography

External links
 Extended biography 

1895 births
1975 deaths
Croatian Jews
Austro-Hungarian Jews
Croatian Austro-Hungarians
Croatian people of Serbian-Jewish descent
Architects from Zagreb
Jewish architects
Burials at Mirogoj Cemetery